The Nxuba Wind Power Station is an operational  wind power plant in South Africa. The power station was developed and is owned by Enel Green Power, an IPP and subsidiary of the Italian multinational, ENEL. The energy generated at this wind farm is sold to the South African national electricity utility company Eskom, under a 20-year power purchase agreement (PPA).

Location
The power station is located near the town of Bedford, in Raymond Mhlaba Municipality, in Amathole District, in Eastern Cape Province. The geographical coordinates of Nxuba Wind Farm are 32°44'30.0"S, 25°56'47.0"E (Latitude:-32.741667; Longitude:25.946389).

Overview
Nxuba Wind Power Station is one of five wind park concessions awarded to Enel Green Power, under the South African government's Renewable Energy Supply Programme (REIPPP). The other four wind farms are (a) Oyster Bay Wind Power Station (b) Garob Wind Power Station (c) Karusa Wind Power Station and (d) Soetwater Wind Power Station. Each wind farm has installed capacity of between 140 MW and 147 MW.

Developers
The Nxuba Wind Power Station was developed and is owned and  currently operated by Enel Green Power, headquartered in Rome, Italy.

Funding
The construction of the five wind farms listed above was budgeted at €1.2 billion. Two South African financial houses, Absa Group and Nedbank Group jointly lent €950 million (79.17 percent) towards the five power stations. Enel Green Power contributed €250 million (20.83 percent) as equity.

Other considerations
It is calculated that the wind farm adds 460 GWh to the South African national grid every year. This enables the country avoid the emission of 500,000 tonnes of carbon dioxide annually.

See also

 List of power stations in South Africa

References

External links
 Nxuba wind farm ready for energy generation As of 27 October 2020.

Economy of the Eastern Cape
Wind farms in South Africa
Energy infrastructure in Africa
2020 establishments in South Africa
Energy infrastructure completed in 2020
Raymond Mhlaba Local Municipality
21st-century architecture in South Africa